Hilton Park services is a motorway service station, between junctions 10a and 11 of the M6 motorway in Staffordshire, England. The nearest city is Wolverhampton.

History

Hilton Park opened in 1970 operated by Toprank, and is now operated by Moto. In 1998 it was reported to be the busiest service station on the UK motorway network. Since the opening of the M6 Toll in 2003, which bypasses Hilton Park and diverts traffic north of Birmingham in the direction of Coventry, the amount of trade has dropped and its size has been reduced.

In 1999 the station was refurbished at a cost of £2.1 million. It was the first service station in the country to include a cybercafe, and the last to have a separate truckers' cafe.

There is also a National Highways traffic officer outstation at the entrance of the southbound site, for which planning permission was granted in January 2004.

References

External links 
Motorway Services Online — Hilton Park

1970 establishments in England
M6 motorway service stations
Moto motorway service stations
Buildings and structures in Staffordshire
Transport in Staffordshire
Transport in Wolverhampton